A7 was a club in New York City that between 1981 and 1984, was one of the main locations of the New York hardcore scene. The tiny space was located on the southeast corner of East 7th Street and Avenue A in Manhattan's East Village. The venue hosted fast punk bands such as The Stimulators or The Violators, and slowly a hardcore scene of initially about 100 persons formed around the club which spawned bands like The Abused, Agnostic Front, Antidote, Cause for Alarm, Cro-Mags, Heart Attack, Kraut, The Mob or Urban Waste who played the A7 regularly, some of them weekly. Although the venue were putting on performances from lesser known New York punk rock and hardcore bands like False Prophets, it became the scene's unofficial headquarters of the scene after Bobby Steele began performing at the venue due to him being banned from CBGB and Max's Kansas City. It also played host to a fertile jazz and reggae scene during the 1980s.

The success of the club led to the owner opening 2+2 club on the intersection of East Houston Street and 2nd Avenue in the summer 1982. This venue was larger and would host performance by bigger performances.

Plaque
In October 2013, a plaque was hung in the room that used to be A7, now in a bar called Niagra, marking the space's history.

References

1981 establishments in New York City
1984 disestablishments in New York (state)
Cultural history of New York City
East Village, Manhattan
Former music venues in New York City
Music venues in Manhattan
Nightclubs in Manhattan
Punk rock venues